The 1982 Player's International Canadian Open was a tennis tournament played on outdoor hard courts. The men's tournament was held at the National Tennis Centre in Toronto in Canada and was part of the 1982 Volvo Grand Prix while the women's tournament was held at the Jarry Park Stadium in Montreal in Canada and was part of the 1982 WTA Tour. The men's tournament was held from August 9 through August 15, 1982, while the women's tournament was held from August 16 through August 22, 1982.

Finals

Men's singles

 Vitas Gerulaitis defeated  Ivan Lendl 4–6, 6–1, 6–3
 It was Gerulaitis' 3rd title of the year and the 29th of his career.

Women's singles
 Martina Navratilova defeated  Andrea Jaeger 6–3, 7–5
 It was Navrátilová's 19th title of the year and the 140th of her career.

Men's doubles
 Steve Denton /  Mark Edmondson defeated  Peter Fleming /  John McEnroe 6–7, 7–5, 6–2
 It was Denton's 5th title of the year and the 13th of his career. It was Edmondson's 9th title of the year and the 28th of his career.

Women's doubles
 Martina Navratilova /  Candy Reynolds defeated  Barbara Potter /  Sharon Walsh 6–4, 6–4
 It was Navrátilová's 20th title of the year and the 141st of her career. It was Reynolds' 2nd title of the year and the 7th of her career.

References

External links
 
 Association of Tennis Professionals (ATP) tournament profile
 Women's Tennis Association (WTA) tournament profile

Player's Canadian Open
Player's Canadian Open
Player's Canadian Open
Canadian Open (tennis)